Cylindera byranti is an extant species of tiger beetle in the genus Cylindera.

References

bryanti
Beetles described in 1983